José Sanchis Grau (19 June 1932 – 2 August 2011) was a Spanish comic book writer. He also worked for Editorial Bruguera and Spanish children comics in general. He was the creator of strips like Pumby (1954) and Robín Robot (1972).

Biography

Early years 
Sanchis was born in Valencia. He started drawing for money when he was 16 years old, in 1948, and later for the magazine Jaimito, with his first recurring character, El soldadito Pepe. Despite being accidentally wounded by gunfire in 1950, he continued to draw for the editorial for the magazine "Cubilete" and the press of Valencia, giving life to series of minor significance, such as El Machote, El Recluta Policarpo, Pandolfito Cebollínez, Gaspar, etc.

Maturity 
In 1954, on the number 260 of the magazine Jaimito, appeared his most prominent character, the cat Pumby, in whose series the author gave free rein to his fantasy, quickly connecting with young audiences. Prove of this is that a few months later, on 23 April 1955, a new magazine with the name of the character, Pumby was launched and it exceeded one thousand numbers, and in December 1959 appeared Super Pumby.

At the same time he developed new comedy series for the weekly magazine directed at women Mariló such as Marilín y la moda (1955) and for Jamito such as El Capitán Mostachete (1958), Sandokancio or Don Esperpento. He worked at Editorial Valenciana until its demise in 1984, but this does not prevent him from publishing works in the press or humorous magazines from other publishers. Some remarkable characters are Benjamín y su pandilla (1955) for the weekly children's Trampolín or Robín Robot, who developed his adventures in the magazine Zipi y Zape of Editorial Bruguera in 1972.

Later work 
After several trials, two judgments were published and Sanchis finally got the rights to his character, who until that point was held by the heirs of Editorial Valenciana. He also achieved "moral compensation for damages resulting from the misappropriation of his work by a third party to use it to non-consensual ends".

Work

References

Bibliography 

 
 

1932 births
2011 deaths
Spanish comics artists
Spanish comics writers
People from Valencia
20th-century Spanish artists